Roridomyces is a genus of fungi in the family Mycenaceae. The genus, widely distributed in temperate areas, was circumscribed by Karl-Heinz Rexer in his 1994 doctoral thesis. Species in the genus were formerly placed in Mycena section Roridae. They are characterized by having a slimy, glutinous stipe in moist conditions.

In 2020, a new bioluminescent species, R. phyllostachydis, was discovered in India. This is the first species of the genus to be found in India.

References

Mycenaceae
Agaricales genera